Moochie may refer to:

 Kevin Corcoran (1949–2015), American child actor, director and producer nicknamed "Moochie"
 Martyn Moochie Norris (born 1973), American basketball coach and former National Basketball Association player
 Moochie, nickname of the lead character in the 1959 film The Shaggy Dog and the 1994 film The Shaggy Dog
 Moochie, one of the dog actors who played Benji

Lists of people by nickname